Sir Montague John Cholmeley, 2nd Baronet (5 August 1802 – 18 January 1874) was a British Liberal Party politician and baronet.

He was the son of Sir Montague Cholmeley, 1st Baronet and his wife Elizabeth Harrison, daughter of John Harrison. In 1831, he succeeded his father as baronet. In 1826, Cholmeley replaced his father as Member of Parliament (MP) for Grantham, a seat he held until 1831. He was High Sheriff of Lincolnshire in 1836 and represented North Lincolnshire from 1847 to 1852 and again from 1857 to 1874.

On 10 February 1829, he married Lady Georgiana Beauclerk, fifth daughter of William Beauclerk, 8th Duke of St Albans and his wife Maria née Nelthorpe. They had a daughter and a son, Hugh, who succeeded to the baronetcy.

See also
Cholmeley baronets
Easton Hall, the family seat

References

External links

1802 births
1874 deaths
Baronets in the Baronetage of the United Kingdom
Liberal Party (UK) MPs for English constituencies
UK MPs 1826–1830
UK MPs 1830–1831
UK MPs 1847–1852
UK MPs 1857–1859
UK MPs 1859–1865
UK MPs 1865–1868
UK MPs 1868–1874
High Sheriffs of Lincolnshire
Montague
Whig (British political party) MPs for English constituencies
Cholmeley baronets